Kerry Simmonds (born April 3, 1989) is an American rower. She is a twice gold medallist at the World Rowing Championships and she won her first Olympic gold in the women's eight at the 2016 Summer Olympics.

References
 Kerry Simmonds at USRowing
 

1989 births
Living people
American female rowers
People from San Diego
World Rowing Championships medalists for the United States
Rowers at the 2016 Summer Olympics
Olympic gold medalists for the United States in rowing
Medalists at the 2016 Summer Olympics
21st-century American women